The Men's 10,000 m speed skating competition for the 2002 Winter Olympics was held in Salt Lake City, Utah, United States. Two-time gold medal winner Gianni Romme won a silver in the 10,000 m, while Jochem Uytdehaage wins with a world record time, becoming the first man to break the 13-minute barrier.

Records

Prior to this competition, the existing world and Olympic records were as follows.

The following new world and Olympic records were set during this competition.

Results

References

Men's speed skating at the 2002 Winter Olympics